Essex Hemphill (April 16, 1957 – November 4, 1995) was an openly gay American poet and activist. He is known for his contributions to the Washington, D.C. art scene in the 1980s, and for openly discussing the topics pertinent to the African-American gay community.

Biography

Early life 
Essex Hemphill was born April 16, 1957, in Chicago, Illinois, to Warren and Mantalene Hemphill, and was the second eldest of five children. Early in his life, he moved to Washington D.C. where he attended Ballou High School. He began writing poetry at the age of fourteen, writing about his own thoughts, family life, and budding sexuality. After graduation, he enrolled at the University of Maryland in 1975 to study journalism. Though he left college after his freshman year, he continued to interact with the D.C. art scene: performing spoken word, working on journals, and beginning to publish his first poetry chapbooks.  He would go on to achieve his degree in English at the University of the District of Columbia.

Career 
In 1979, Hemphill and his colleagues started the Nethula Journal of Contemporary Literature, a publication aimed at showcasing the works of modern black artists.  One of his first public readings was arranged by Nethula co-editor E. Ethelbert Miller at Howard University’s Founder Library where he performed beside and befriended filmmaker Michelle Parkerson.  He also performed at other institutions, including Harvard University, University of Pennsylvania, and University of California at Los Angeles to name a few.

In 1982, Essex Hemphill, Larry Duckett, his close friend, and Wayson Jones, his university roommate, founded the spoken word group called "Cinque," which performed in the Washington D.C. area.  Hemphill continued performing his rhythmic, spoken word poetry, and in 1983, received a grant from Washington Project for the Arts to perform an "experimental dramatization" of poetry entitled Murder on Glass, alongside Parkerson and Jones.  Hemphill also began publishing his own collections of poetry during this time, beginning with Diamonds Was in the Kitty and Some of the People We Love (1982), and followed by the more favorably reviewed Earth Life (1985) and Conditions (1986).  He would garner more national attention when his work was included in In the Life (1986), an anthology of poems from black, gay artists, compiled by Hemphill's good friend, lover, and fellow author, Joseph F. Beam.  His poetry has been published widely in journals, and his essays have appeared in Obsidian, Black Scholar, CALLALOO, and Essence among others. In 1986, Hemphill received a fellowship in poetry from the National Endowment for the Arts.

Essex Hemphill also made appearances in a number of documentaries between 1989 and 1992. In 1989, he appeared in Looking for Langston, a film directed by Isaac Julien about poet Langston Hughes and the Harlem Renaissance. Hemphill also worked with Emmy award-winning filmmaker Marlon Riggs on two documentaries:Tongues Untied (1989) which looked into the complex overlapping of black and queer identities, and Black is... Black Ain't (1992) which discussed what exactly constitutes "blackness."

After Beam's death from AIDS in 1988, Essex Hemphill and Beam's mother worked conjointly in order to publish his sequel to In the Life.  The second manuscript was published in 1991 under the title Brother to Brother: New Writings by Black Gay Men, which archived the works of about three dozen authors, including Hemphill himself. Writing about Hemphill and Beam in his book, Evidence of Being: The Black Gay Cultural Renaissance and the Politics of Violence, Darius Bost notes that Hemphill moved in with Beam's mother to help finish the anthology, taking on domestic tasks in exchange for room and board. He writes that Hemphill said in an interview that the anthology “was produced in the ‘context of confronting AIDS and the death around us. It’s almost like a fierce resistance that says, ‘Before I die, I’m going to say these things.’’” Hemphill also wrote a poem dedicated to Beam after his death titled “When My Brother Fell,” and dedicated his 1986 poem “Heavy Corners” to him. In 1990, he gave a speech at the OutWrite conference (where he was the only Black panelist), which eventually became the introduction to the anthology. Brother to Brother would go on to win a Lambda Literary Award.

In 1992, Hemphill published his largest collection of poetry and short stories, entitled Ceremonies: Prose and Poetry, which included recent work, but also selection from his earlier poetry collections, Earth Life and Conditions. The next year, the anthology would be awarded the National Library Association's Gay, Lesbian, and Bisexual New Author Award and a Pew Charitable Trust Fellowship in the Arts. In 1993, he was a visiting scholar at the Getty Center.

Death 
In the 1990s, Hemphill would rarely give information about his health, although he would occasionally talk about "being a person with AIDS."  It was not until 1994 that he wrote about his experiences with the disease in his poem "Vital Signs." He died on November 4, 1995, of AIDS-related complications.

Legacy 
After his death, December 10, 1995 was announced by three organizations (Gay Men of African Descent (GMAD), Other Countries, and Black Nations/Queer Nations?) to be a National Day of Remembrance for Essex Hemphill at New York City's Lesbian and Gay Community Services Center. Cheryl Dunye dedicated her 1996 film Watermelon Woman to Hemphill.

In his essay "(Re)- Recalling Essex Hemphill" in Words to Our Now, Thomas Glave, pays tribute to Hemphill's life, focusing on the lasting effects of his actions. Glave writes:In this now, we celebrate your life and language Essex. So celebrating, we know that we re-call you in what is largely, to borrow from another visionary, a 'giantless time.' The sheer giantry of your breathing presence has passed. Now present and future warriors—ourselves and others—will be compelled to learn, as you did and made manifest, that all hauls toward truth—toward venality; ardor, not arrogance; forthrightness, not cowardice.In 2014, Martin Duberman wrote Hold Tight Gently: Michael Callen, Essex Hemphill, and the Battlefield of AIDS in which Duberman documents the life of Essex Hemphill, along with author and activist, Michael Callen. The book would go on to win the Lambda Literary Award for LGBT Nonfiction.

In June 2019, Hemphill was one of the inaugural fifty American “pioneers, trailblazers, and heroes” inducted on the National LGBTQ Wall of Honor within the Stonewall National Monument (SNM) in New York City’s Stonewall Inn. The SNM is the first U.S. national monument dedicated to LGBTQ rights and history, and the wall’s unveiling was timed to take place during the 50th anniversary of the Stonewall riots.

Works

Themes 
Much of Hemphill's poetry and spoken word was autobiographical, and portrayed his experiences as a minority in both the African-American and LGBT communities.

He wrote pieces such as "Family Jewels," which conveyed his frustrations about white bigotry, specifically within the gay community. In his essay "Does Your Momma Know About me?" Hemphill criticizes photographer Robert Mapplethorpe's The Black Book, which showcased pictures of the penises of black men.  Hemphill argued that excluding the faces of the black male subjects demonstrated the fetishism of African Americans by whites in the gay community.

The poems and essays in Ceremonies address the sexual objectification of black men in white culture, relationships among gay black men and non-gay black men, HIV/AIDS in the black community and the meaning of family. He also goes on to critique both the institutionalized patriarchy, and dominant gender identities within society.

Hemphill repeatedly invoked loneliness throughout his work. Loneliness in Hemphill's work is a traumatic feeling, a constant sense of rejection. Many of the men returned home after being rejected by white gay communities, only to be rejected within black communities as well. In Hemphill's poetry, he portrays loneliness as a collective feeling. He defined loneliness as a sense of being, marked by suffering without public recognition. A sense of separation from the public creates a social longing because even though the journey is lonesome, fighting against that journey not to kill you, as Hemphill said in one of his poems,  makes you yearn for community and support.

Essays 
(essay in) Patrick Merla (ed.), Boys Like Us: Gay Writers Tell Their Coming Out Stories, Avon Books. 1996
(essays in) Thomas Avena (ed.), "Life Sentences: Writers, Artists, and AIDS", Mercury House. 1994
Ceremonies: Prose and Poetry, 1992; Cleis Press, 2000, 
Conditions: Poems, Be Bop Books, 1986

Anthologies
In the Life
Gay and Lesbian Poetry in Our Time
Art Against Apartheid
Men and Intimacy
High Risk
New Men
New Minds
Natives
Tourists and Other Mysteries
(ed.) Brother to Brother: New Writings by Black Gay Men, 1991; RedBone Press, 2007,

Appearances
Looking for Langston (1989)
Tongues Untied (1989)
Black Is...Black Ain't (1994)
Narrator: Out of the Shadows, AIDS documentary

Notes

References

Duberman, Martin. Hold Tight Gently: Michael Callen, Essex Hemphill and the Battlefield of AIDS, New York: The New Press, 2014.

External links
Portrait by Jonathan G. Silin, Yale Collection of American Literature, Beinecke Rare Book and Manuscript Library

Essex Hemphill, Poetry Foundation

African-American poets
American LGBT poets
1957 births
1995 deaths
American male poets
American gay writers
LGBT African Americans
Lambda Literary Award winners
Stonewall Book Award winners
Pew Fellows in the Arts
Activists for African-American civil rights
American LGBT rights activists
Activists from Illinois
LGBT people from Illinois
Writers from Illinois
AIDS-related deaths in Pennsylvania
African-American activists
20th-century American poets
20th-century American male writers
20th-century American LGBT people
African-American male writers
Gay poets